JKH may refer to:
 Chios Island National Airport's IATA codes
 John Keells Holdings
 JKH Entertainment, record label for C-Note